Seán Ardagh (25 November 1947 – 17 May 2016) was an Irish Fianna Fáil politician who served as a Teachta Dála (TD) for the Dublin South-Central constituency from 1997 to 2011.

A chartered accountant by profession, Ardagh obtained his qualification in Canada in the 1970s and returned to Ireland to practice. Ardagh was first elected to Dáil Éireann at the 1997 general election and retained his seat at the 2002 and 2007 general elections. Ardagh replaced Ben Briscoe as the TD and main candidate for Fianna Fáil in Dublin South-Central in 2002. He served as Chairman of a number of Dáil committees during his time as a TD.

He was first elected to Dublin County Council in 1985 and remained a member until 1999. He was elected to Dublin City Council in 1999 and remained a councillor until 2003.

On 9 December 2010, he announced he would not be standing at the 2011 general election. He resigned as a TD on 28 January 2011, in advance of the 2011 general election.

His daughter is Senator Catherine Ardagh. He died on 17 May 2016 after a long illness.

References

 

1947 births
2016 deaths
Alumni of University College Dublin
Councillors of Dublin County Council
Fianna Fáil TDs
Local councillors in Dublin (city)
Local councillors in South Dublin (county)
Members of the 28th Dáil
Members of the 29th Dáil
Members of the 30th Dáil
Politicians from County Dublin
University of Toronto alumni